Soumya Pakre (born 18 March 1989) is an Indian former cricketer. He played two List A matches for Bengal in 2010.

See also
 List of Bengal cricketers

References

External links
 

1989 births
Living people
Indian cricketers
Bengal cricketers
People from Hooghly district